Kornowac  is a village in Racibórz County, Silesian Voivodeship, in southern Poland. It is the seat of the gmina (administrative district) called Gmina Kornowac.

The village has a population of 890.

References

Kornowac